Nayanthara Chakravarthy (born 20 April 2002), also known as Baby Nayanthara, is an Indian actress who works in Malayalam cinema. She has acted in Malayalam, Telugu, Hindi and Tamil-language Films, and has established herself as a lead child actress. Nayanthara made her acting debut in the Malayalam film Kilukkam Kilukilukkam in 2005, for which she won the “Sathyan Memorial Award” for the Best Child Artist in 2006.

Career
Nayanthara, born on 20 April 2002 in Thiruvananthapuram District of Kerala is the daughter of Maninath Chakravarthy and Bindu Maninath. She has a younger brother, Ayaan Chakravarthy. She started her acting career at the age of 3. She studied at Christ Nagar School, Thiruvananthapuram till class 2 after which, she moved to Kochi where she finished her schooling in The Choice School, Thrippunithura.

Her notable works include Kilukkam Kilukilukkam, Swarnam, Loud Speaker, Trivandrum Lodge, Marupadi. She has appeared several commercials including The Chennai Silks, RMKV Silks and Silver Storm Parks.

Awards

Filmography
All films are in Malayalam, unless otherwise noted.

References 

2002 births
Child actresses in Malayalam cinema
Indian child actresses
Living people